Kaiser Khan Nizamani is a Pakistani actor, director and producer. He has been working as a senior actor on television since 1990s and appeared in Lead and supporting roles. He has achieved Pakitann's Presidential Award PRIDE OF PERFORMANCE.

Personal life 

Khan married his fellow actress Fazila Qazi in 1998. The couple has two sons.

Career 

Khan started his career in 1990s. Besides acting in Sindhi television series, he also appeared in PTV television series such as Marvi and Hawain. He made his film debut in 2013 with mystery-thriller Josh: Independence Through Unity. Some of his other television appearances include Alif Allah Aur Insaan, Laapata and Bakhtawar.

Filmography

Film 
 Josh: Independence Through Unity (2013)

Television 
 Marvi (1993)
 Hawain (1997)
 Makan (2006)
 Roshan Sitara (2012)
 Alif Allah Aur Insaan (2017–18)
 Yun Tu Hai Pyar Bohut (2021)
 Laapata (2021)
 Wafa Be Mol (2021)
 Bakhtawar (2022)

References 

Pakistani male film actors
Male actors in Hindi cinema
Living people
21st-century Indian male actors
Year of birth missing (living people)